New York Central College, commonly called New York Central College, McGrawville, and simply Central College, was the first college in the United States founded on the principle that all qualified students were welcome. It was thus an abolitionist institution. It was founded by Cyrus Pitt Grosvenor and other anti-slavery Baptists in McGraw, New York (at the time called McGrawville; not modern McGrawville, New York). The sponsoring organization was the American Baptist Free Mission Society, of which Grosvenor was a vice-president. It was chartered by New York State in April 1848, laid the cornerstone of its main building on July 4, and opened in September 1849. Its "prominent features" were "Radical Anti-Slavery, and Equality of the Sexes".

It has been called a predecessor of Cornell University.

The college lasted about 10 years. As put by the author of a modern study, "A little town tried to create a place without any prejudice, and it did make a difference. It created humanitarians and heroes in a time where nothing else existed like this." While Oberlin and Oneida had accepted African-American students, and Oberlin female students, New York Central College was the first institution in the country founded to accept all students, which it did from its very first day. This was the vision of its founder, Cyrus Pitt Grosvenor.

As was common in the Antebellum period, when there were no public secondary schools anywhere in America, Central had a large preparatory, or high school, division. Students at the college level were never more than a small minority of the student body. At the first commencement in 1855, there were five graduates, with a student body of well over 100. There were some students at the primary level. Yet there was no question that Central was a college, whatever the ratio of students, and not an academy, whose studies ended at the high school level (typically including Latin and Greek).

The American Baptist Free Mission Society

Abolitionism 
The American Baptist Free Mission Society broke away from its parent, the American Baptist Home Mission Society, over the issue of slavery, more specifically whether slaveowners could be members, missionaries, or donors to the society.

From the beginning, the College was to be open to all, whatever the "race" or gender. At the presentation to the citizens of McGrawville, its description begins saying that it will differ from the Hamilton Literary & Theological Institution (now Colgate University) in only one feature: "it lays down as a broad platform, the rights and privileges of all classes of citizens as of paramount importance. It will be an Institution of Learning from which no individual will be rejected."   Hamilton had a reputation for not opposing slavery; Gerrit Smith resigned from their Board of Trustees "on the grounds that the school was insufficiently anti-slavery". When Hamilton students sent a petition to the New York Legislature "in behalf of the oppressed free colored citizens of the state", this made them "guilty of the awful crime of abolitionism", and the Legislature almost immediately withdrew the College's $5,000 appropriation. The President and five professors, with the support of "citizens of Oneida County", informed the legislature than an outsider (a legislator) had misled the students, who "disclaim all sympathy with abolition societies". The anti-slavery petition was unauthorized by the faculty, and "at variance with the principles of the college government, and with the judgment and feeling of every officer of the institution". The appropriation was immediately restored.

Founding of its college

The College was founded in McGrawville, "a quiet and healthy place" according to the college's advertisement in the abolitionist National Era, because of a pledge by the village of $12,000 towards construction costs; Perry, New York, had offered $10,000. The initial community meeting in McGrawville to discuss the proposed college was held on November 22, 1847. It already had a Board of Trustees, with Reverend Cyrus Pitt Grosvenor of Utica, who spoke at the meeting, as President. Its location not yet determined, it was referred to as the "Baptist Free Mission Institution". Construction commenced on June 26, 1848, and the cornerstone was laid on July 4. In the cornerstone was a box with 20 items, many of them abolitionist newspapers or pamphlets. By then it was referred to as the Free Central College.

Speaking at the laying of the cornerstone, Grosvenor "vindicated the character of Women, repelled the idea of her inferiority to man, and maintained the necessity of giving to our daughters an education equal to that given to our sons." Of the students whose gender can be determined, 35% were women.

The Bible was "to be introduced as a text-book and test-book from beginning to end of the course of instruction." Manual labor, including farmwork, was to be part of students' daily activities. This was not just for finances, although it brought in a little money, nor to prepare students for careers, to which the labor was usually unrelated, but was seen as psychologically and spiritually beneficial. At the time, this was an innovative view.

Some opposition from those with means of the labor requirement was met with a stinging reply:

New York Central College was the name decided on, and the College was chartered by the New York State Legislature on April 12, 1848. The Board of Trustees had 24 members.

The College began activities on September 4, 1849. Black professor Charles L. Reason delivered an inaugural address, on the topic "Harmony of the Principles of the College with Man's True Destiny and the Tendencies of the Present Age." It was described in the press as "full of clear comprehensive, philosophical thought, clothed in a neat and classical dress." President Grosvenor spoke on "Education: Physical, Mental, and Moral." The abolitionist philanthropist Gerrit Smith also spoke. There was a "congregation" of more than 2,000 at the induction of the faculty, the following day.

Overviews of the Central College experience 
As part of an unsuccessful attempt to have a medical school open to all students established in McGrawville, William G. Allen wrote to Gerrit Smith that "[n]o where is the state of things more favorable to the colored man's progress than in McGrawville, and no where would he receive a warmer welcome." At the time—1852—Allen was the only Black college professor in the country.

A description of the people at a college dinner, 1850 

Two Onondaga Native Americans enrolled in the Preparatory Division.

Summary by a graduate 
This is how the college was described by an alumna and instructor, Angeline Stickney:

Faculty, students, subjects taught
The affairs of the College were conducted with an informality and lack of rules that are startling seen from a modern perspective. There was no "mission statement" nor academic ranks, nor were specific requirements for a degree ever set down (and given the constantly changing faculty, they would have been hard to staff). The only records kept were the minutes of the Board of Trustees and the financial records, supplemented by correspondence and many newspaper articles.

The relationship between teachers and students, while not amorous at all (save for the Allen–King marriage, on which see below), was closer than would seem normal in the United States today. Most of the faculty's time was spent in contact with students, teaching formally or informally. All were living in a small town, where everyone knew each other. In most cases they attended the same church; all kitchens in McGrawville prepared similar food; all heard the same visiting lecturers.

Students and professors were not allowed to use alcohol or (much more unusual) tobacco.

College finances
From a financial point of view, Central College was poorly run. There were no financial plans or budgets. There was little fundraising; in contrast with its predecessor the Oneida Institute, no one went calling on possible donors. The college did not publicize itself.

It was inadequately funded from beginning to end, and ended in bankruptcy. Except for Gerrit Smith, it had no wealthy donors, no alumni to draw upon. The American Baptist Free Mission Society gave what support it could, especially at the beginning, but it was a small group and its members had limited resources.

There are contradictory reports about subvention(s) from the New York State Legislature, such as Union College, Columbia College, and others routinely received. If there was legislative support, it was not ongoing.

The student body was relatively poor, and burdened with paying for accommodations and meals, and transportation to McGrawville, in addition to instruction. A school half made up of Negroes, most of whom were at the high school level, was not going to be financially prosperous or even self-sufficient. The 30% of the students who were female were also anything but prosperous. Well-to-do families who could easily afford to send their sons to college were not going to send them to the college for Negroes and women in McGrawville (called, by racists, "the nigger college"). Some money was brought in through the manual labor department, but not enough.

So as to make education possible for these relatively impoverished students, tuition was set very low. In the college division it was first $24, then $30 per year, and in the preparatory [high school] division, $15. The vast majority of students were in the preparatory program. An estimated 100 preparatory students per year, at $15 each, is $1,500. An estimated 20 college students at $30 each would bring in $600, for a total of $2,100. By comparison, 15 years previously the Canterbury Female Boarding School charged $75 for tuition, meaning the tuition paid by its 24 students totalled $1,800.

Funds available to pay faculty, therefore, were very limited, and probably contributed to the high faculty turnover. Except for Grosvenor, whose children were grown, faculty were unmarried and did not have families; the salaries paid would not permit it. The college's expenses simply exceeded its income.

In fact, it is remarkable that it lasted as long as it did. Previously schools with "racially" integrated bodies (the Noyes Academy and the Canterbury Female Boarding School) were quickly destroyed by White mob violence.

Faculty

There were no written criteria for selecting faculty; some came with a college degree, but many did not. Apparently the President, Grosvenor and then Calkins, decided himself whom to hire and what they would teach. There was no public announcement of vacancies, nor was there an application process nor documents required. Personal contacts and correspondence played a big role. The difference between the courses and teachers for the large preparatory or high school division, and the smaller college division, was not rigid. Two faculty (Caldwell, Smith) began as students and joined the faculty upon their graduation; one (Stickney) was teaching in advance of her graduation.

There was, therefore, a lot of turnover in the faculty, and the subjects taught varied depending on the faculty. There was not a faculty in the sense of a body of full-time employees.

Central was the first college to hire African-American faculty. There were three very well qualified African-American professors, who successively occupied the same position: Charles L. Reason (1849-1852), William G. Allen (1852–1853), and George Boyer Vashon (1853–1859).

There are two known lists of the faculty (in newspaper announcements). The original faculty, in 1849, were:
 C. P. Grosvenor, President, and Professor of Intellectual and Moral Philosophy (epistemology and ethics). He resigned at the end of 1851. He was replaced by Leonard G. Calkins, "a finished scholar, an accomplished orator, and a true gentleman, a deep thinker, of active temperament". 
 L. H. Waters and Charles L. Reason, Professors of Greek, Latin and French Languages, and Mathematics and Natural Philosophy (science). Reason was the first African-American faculty member in an American college.
 Victor M. Kingsley (1821–1897), Tutor
 Mrs. Eliza M. Haven, "Matron, and Prof. French Language, Music, Drawing, &c."
 Miss Sophia M. Lathrop [Bishop] (1828–1913), "Prof. English Literature, &c." Nothing is known about her education. She first taught in Friendship, New York. She only taught at Central for one year; afterwards she was Preceptress at the Hamilton Female Seminary in Hamilton, New York. Her sister Maria E. Lathrop [Bean] (1833–1908) studied at Central and also taught painting there.

By 1852, three years later, the faculty were completely different (100% turnover):
 Wm. Tillinghast, A.M., professor of mathematics
 William G. Allen, African-American professor of Greek and German Languages, rhetoric, and belles lettres (literature). After the departure of Grosvenor, who taught Hebrew, Allen was listed as teaching it. After Allen's departure in 1853, his position was filled by George Boyer Vashon.
 E. R. Akin, A. M., D. M., professor of natural sciences
 A. B. Campbell, A. M, professor of Latin language and Literature
 George Lester Brockett (1827–1880), graduate of Hamilton College in 1851, was described in an obituary as professor of Elocution and German. However, he also taught Greek, German, and Physiology. "In 1852, he was also a tutor and the Librarian." His father had been a warm personal friend of abolitionists Beriah Green and Gerrit Smith. In 1857 his wife Caroline A. Campbell, "the former accomplished teacher in the department of Drawing and Painting", was rehired.
 G. L. Brockett, A. B., tutor. She was still employed in 1858, when she spoke "forcibly" against the skirt at a National Dress Reform Convention (see Bloomers (clothing)).
 A. J. Chamberlain, teacher of French and drawing.
 Lydia A. Caldwell, enrolled as a student when the College opened in 1849. The year in which she graduated and became a teacher, if she did in fact graduate, is unknown, but she remained until 1855 as "Professor of Rhetoric and English Literature". She died in 1857 of tuberculosis ("consumption"). Effusive prose pieces and poetry by Caldwell appeared in several newspapers; the references here are only examples.

Students
The student body has been well studied by Marlene Parks.

There are 1062 known students; most were in the preparatory (high school) program. Of them, 64% were men, 35% female, 1% unknown. As no records were kept of it, the skin color ("race") of the students is not known; however, there were relatively few Blacks: Baquaqua, Edmonia Lewis, Benjamin Boseman, others.

In 1856 there were 226 students and 9 faculty, and approximately 50% were African-American. Most were in the college's preparatory (high school) program.

Curriculum and faculty
Grosvenor "proposed a 'free institution,' for the 'literary, scientific, moral, and physical education of both sexes and of all classes of youth.'" The school's curriculum included Classical education as well as agricultural science. The Rev. Grosvenor served as the school's first president, 1849–1851. Under the "careful training" of the President students took a Rhetorical Class "with daily exercises in Extemporaneous Speaking", "not to be overlooked in this day of 'public speaking'".

The college was modeled after Oberlin, which in 1835 began admitting blacks and in 1837 women. However, New York Central College was the first American college founded on the principle that all are created equal: black and white, male and female. Qualified Black, female, and Native American students were all welcome. It was also the first to have African-American professors, in a position filled by three men: first Charles L. Reason. An unexplained disagreement with Grosvenor led to his departure. His replacement was William G. Allen, a graduate of the Oneida Institute, another short-lived school which was a predecessor of the college. After Allen's departure (see below) he was replaced by George Boyer Vashon, the first African-American graduate of Oberlin. Reason was the first black college professor in the country. Allen was Professor of Rhetoric and Greek; in 1850, when he was appointed, he was "well known as a lecturer upon the origin, literature, and destiny of the African race."

In May 1850 there were over a hundred students enrolled, and college housing being full, students had to take rooms in private houses.

Shortly after its opening, the College and McGrawville were hit by a smallpox outbreak. An 1851 student resolution gives the names of two, Homer Haskell and Erskine Spring. Four students died and the College had to close briefly. Another source says six students died. At that time, there were 150 students.

In 1850 the trustees and then the students of the college published resolutions they had passed in support of William L. Chaplin, in jail for helping two slaves escape.

There were those in Syracuse and Rochester who wished to move the College to their city, but nothing came of it. The Corresponding Secretary of the Trustees, A. H. Benedict, who was also editor of the Cortland County Express, said in an editorial that no such discussions had taken place, even privately. He suggested that instead of the College relocating to Syracuse, Syracuse should relocate to McGrawville, once "it has done with theatres and their appendages, and her other and numerous sources of corruption.... The moral atmosphere of a city is not congenial to the habits of students, nor the growth of an institution founded on the manusl labor principle, and on equality of sex and condition, as is this college."

In 1851 it was one of 11 colleges to receive New York State legislative funding; it received $1,500, the same amount as New York University, Fordham University, Hamilton College, and Madison University (Colgate). A few weeks later, another report says that the college received an appropriation of $25,000, but a college solicitation in 1855 said the College had received no appropriations from the state. A Baptist report of 1851 states that its Free Mission Society raised $30,000 for the college.

Samuel J. May in 1851 spoke at the college on the English abolitionist George Thompson (abolitionist).

In 1852, according to Professor William G. Allen, "There is now a project on foot to attach a medical department to New York Central College. — A glorious idea this, as, if it should be successful, it will afford an opening for study to the very many colored young men who are now, by prejudice and scorn, shut out of most, if not all, of the medical colleges in the land. The faculty are physicians of Syracuse, in high standing and repute." Nothing came of this, although there is a reference to a Professor of Anatomy at the college. The medical college was established in New York City. Similarly, in 1850 there was an unsuccessful attempt to get the legislature to fund an "Agricultural Professorship".

The college's first commencement was in 1855, with 5 graduates. One of the graduates, Azariah Smith, was immediately hired to teach Greek, remaining until 1858.

In 1857 Howard W. Gilbert was hired as Professor of Modern Languages. A news article refers to his mastery of French, German, and Italian.

Also in 1857, the college had a Teachers' Department, training, at the high school level, teachers for the primary grades (normal school), an Academic Department preparing high school students for college, and a Collegiate Department. There was a class in public speaking.

Facilities
Boys and men were in the dormitory occupying one floor of the main building; girls (no adult female students are recorded) were in a separate residence, with a matron. There is no reference to any housing specifically for colored students. However, there was a separate cemetery for Black college students.

Hostility to the college
Because of its equalitarian treatment of Black students and its Black professors, the "nigger college at McGrawville", as it was called by racists, as well as the "McGrawville African College", received a lot of public vituperation. "It would be bad enough, in our estimation, to bring together girls and boys, young men and women, of the same race and color, under the same roof, in the same halls, and at the same table. But to mix together the descendants of Ham and Japeth [(sons of Noah)], the ebony sons of Africa with the fair daughters of the Anglo-Saxon, and the ruddy-cheeked boy with the Ethiopian maid, is stilt  worse."

At that time, there not being any public colleges in the state, the New York State Legislature would appropriate funds to Union College, Hamilton College and others. A proposed appropriation to New York Central College in 1851 was the topic of much comment, the subject "the center of attractions [in the Legislature]...for some hours". A New York legislator said that rather than giving a state appropriation to that "vile sink of pollution", it would be better given to "a mob that will raze it to the ground", because it "was at war with every principle of American liberty". The New York Tribune called it a "treasonable college", an "obnoxious edifice" where, "if things are suffered to go on at this rate, this whole region will become infected with Abolitionism; the contagion of Free Speech will spread til the Fugitive Slave law will become a nullity and the Union will collapse!" Others objected, with less outrage, to "the amalgamation of sexes, as well as of races." These were, according to the Baltimore Sun, "very strange and dangerous notions". However, the appropriation passed comfortably, and was increased in size.

The local hostility to the college was a factor in its demise. As it was put in a typically inaccurate newspaper column, which mistakenly puts Mary King's father at the head of the college:

William Allen affair

A scandal arose when, in 1853, an African-American professor, William G. Allen, became engaged to a white student, Mary King. To escape violent repercussions, Allen fled to New York City, where he was joined by his fiancée. They married—the first black male–white female marriage in the country's history—and immediately left for England, never to return. This event exacerbated already lingering social and political opposition to the school. Marlene Parks has published a collection of press clippings, which show the hostility.

Decline and closure
In a circular of 1854 we find that "this Institution is now in prosperous condition. It has struggled through darkness, and mounted difficulties, until its permanency and success are placed entirely beyond doubt." However, only a few years later it became clear that the College was in financial trouble. "Everything that an able faculty could do to advance the interests of the Institution has been done, and yet the College has not prospered. Its friends are discouraged, and the Board of Directors disheartened. Present appearances indicate 
that the College will either pass into the hands of its colored friends, or be purchased by the citizens of M'Grawville , and be renovated and reorganised into a seminary or academic institution [high school], or finally cease to exist as a College."

The school was later denied funding by the New York State Legislature, and it was bankrupt by 1858.

President Calkins left for a position at "an eminent law school in Albany"; the trustees persuaded Grosvenor to take up the leadership again.

The College faced bankruptcy, and discontinued operations. The philanthropist and abolitionist Gerrit Smith, who lived nearby, in Peterboro, became the proprietor of the insolvent college. He assumed its debts, which exceeded its assets; as a newspaper put it, "he became the owner of the property when the college was abandoned." A modern scholar has suggested that Smith's breakdown and hospitalization after public discovery of his connection with John Brown's failed raid on Harpers Ferry, of late 1859, contributed to the college's closure.(Under Smith.)

A smallpox epidemic struck McGrawville in 1860. The effects of the outbreak, coupled with the lingering social and political opposition and financial difficulties, caused the college to close that same year. Another source says it closed in 1859.

The New York Central Railroad, with which there is no known connection, began in 1853.

New York Central Academy
According to the New York State Department of Education, New York Central Academy, organized by citizens of McGrawville, was chartered May 4, 1864. It operated from 1864 to 1867. It purchased the buildings and land for $6,500 from Gerrit Smith in 1864. In 1868 it became part of the McGrawville Union School, and remained in use as a high school until a new building was constructed in 1885.

Daniel S. Lamont (1851–1905), Secretary of War under President Grover Cleveland, was from McGraw, and studied as a child at the Central Academy, "the successor of a queer institution, known as the New York Central College, established by Gerrit Smith and other abolitionists, for the education of boys and girls without regard to color."

Alumni
Marlene Parks has published an exhaustive collection of information about Central's alumni.

Angeline Stickney, teacher, suffragist, and mathematician. Graduated in 1855 with the first class. During her last year she also taught; among her students was her eventual husband, astronomer Asaph Hall. Stickney, the largest crater on Mars's moon Phobos, is named for her. In the biography written by her son Angelo Hall there are two chapters on her experiences at the College.
Asaph Hall, astronomer, known for his discovery of the moons of Mars.
Edmonia Lewis, sculptor
Mahommah Gardo Baquaqua, former slave, missionary
Eldridge Eugene Fish, scientist and school principal.
 Herman Ossian Armour, co-founder of Armour & Co.
 Edgar M. Marble, U.S. Patent Commissioner, 1880–83
Grace A. Mapps, graduated in 1852, possibly the first black woman to graduate with a four year college degree
 Benjamin Boseman, physician in Charleston, South Carolina, after serving in the Civil War as surgeon in the U.S. Colored Troops. Served three terms in the South Carolina House of Representatives. Appointed postmaster of Charleston by President Ulysses S. Grant.
 A. J. Warner, school principal. attorney, member of Congress from Ohio, President of the American Bimetallic League.
 George B. Davis, Esq., attorney, Ithaca, New York (not George Breckenrith Davis)
 Emma Grosvenor (ca. 1852–1853), daughter of founder Cyrus Grosvenor, died aged 21
 Sarah Grosvenor, her sister, married a Baptist minister and died at 92.
 John Quincy Cowee (1830–1921), Kansan farmer, described as "a scholar and a gentleman", with "an enviable reputation for truth and sobriety".
 Judson Smith, D.D. (1837–1906), Congregational minister, professor at Oberlin, missionary
 Truman J. Ellinwood, for 35 years stenographer of the sermons of Henry Ward Beecher.

See also 
 Anton Wilhelm Amo (c. 1703 – c. 1759), a black man from Ghana who studied in Germany, became a philosopher, and taught in German universities.
 Juan Latino, a black college professor in sixteenth-century Spain
 Storer College, in Harpers Ferry, West Virginia, founded in 1868 by another branch of Free Baptists, was the second college in the United States open to all, regardless of skin color and gender. Like New York Central, most of its instruction was at the secondary school level.

References

Further reading

Video

Primary sources

External links
McGraw Historical Society collection of New York Central College material

 
Defunct private universities and colleges in New York (state)
Baptist universities and colleges in the United States
Educational institutions established in 1849
Educational institutions disestablished in 1860
Education in Cortland County, New York
1849 establishments in New York (state)
1860 disestablishments in New York (state)
Liberal arts colleges in New York (state)
Agricultural universities and colleges in the United States
Antebellum educational institutions that admitted African Americans
Recipients of aid from Gerrit Smith
American manual labor schools
Buildings and structures in Cortland County, New York